Black Spurs is a 1965 American Western film directed by R. G. Springsteen and written by Steve Fisher. The film stars Rory Calhoun, Linda Darnell (in her final film role), Terry Moore, Scott Brady, Lon Chaney Jr., James Best, Richard Arlen, Bruce Cabot and scenes with James Brown and DeForest Kelley. The film was released on June 25, 1965, by Paramount Pictures.

Plot

Santee (Rory Calhoun) becomes a bounty hunter to earn enough money to marry Anna (Terry Moore), the woman he loves. But when he returns home to Kile, Kansas, he learns she has married Ralph Elkins (James Best), a sheriff, and left town.

Santee schemes with land baron Gus Kile (Lon Chaney Jr.) to ruin the town of Lark's reputation so that the railroad scheduled to be built in Lark will instead be built in Kile. Santee arranges for a brothel madam, Sadie (Linda Darnell), and her girls to come to Lark. Reverend Tanner (Scott Brady) and other townspeople are appalled. Unknown until he arrives, Lark is Anna's new hometown and that her husband is the town's sheriff.

Things get out of hand in Lark, and when sheriff Elkins is tarred and feathered, and Pastor Tanner's right arm is broken for ringing the church bell relentlessly, Santee changes sides. He learns from Anna that her young son Chad is actually his son who has been adopted by Ralph Elkins. Santee, with help of sheriff Elkins and Pastor Tanner, cleans up the community. After cleaning up Lark but before riding out of town, Santee offers to financially help with Chad's welfare. Anna says no, that's not necessary, but Santee can send gifts to the boy as his Uncle Santee. Santee will keep his secret from the young lad. Santee thinks he may became a sheriff in some town that he believes needs him. He leaves Anna, Ralph and Chad with his best wishes.

Cast 
Rory Calhoun as Santee
Linda Darnell as Sadie (Her final film role, death was April 10, 1965 due to a house fire in Glenview, Illinois)
Terry Moore as Anna Elkins
Scott Brady as Reverend Tanner
Lon Chaney Jr. as Gus Kile 
Richard Arlen as Pete Muchin
Bruce Cabot as Bill Henderson
Patricia Owens as Clare Grubbs
James Best as Sheriff Ralph Elkins
Jerome Courtland as Sam Grubbs
DeForest Kelley as Sheriff Dal Nemo
Joseph Hoover as Swifty
James Brown as Sheriff
Robert Carricart as El Pescadore
Barbara Wilkin as Mrs. Rourke
Jeanne Baird as Mrs. Greta Nemo
Sandra Giles as Sadie's Girl - 1st
Sally Nichols as Sadie's Girl - 2nd
Rusty Allen as Sadie's Girl - 3rd 
Joseph Forte as Banker 
Guy Wilkerson as Henry
Lorraine Bendix as Henry's Wife, Mabel
Read Morgan as Blacksmith
Patricia King as Kyle Townslady
Chuck Roberson as Prisoner Norton
Howard Joslin as Prisoner Cobb
Max Power as Doctor
William Bickmore as Chad Elkins
Manuel Padilla Jr. as Manuel Reese

See also
List of American films of 1965

References

External links 
 

1965 films
1960s English-language films
Paramount Pictures films
American Western (genre) films
1965 Western (genre) films
Films directed by R. G. Springsteen
1960s American films